The Perfect Host is a 2010 American black comedy/psychological thriller film written and directed by Nicholas Tomnay, a remake of Tomnay's short film The Host (2001). The film stars David Hyde Pierce and Clayne Crawford. Filming took place in Los Angeles, California, over seventeen days.

Plot
Fugitive John Taylor flees an initially unspecified crime, with a wounded foot. (Flashbacks and news reports reveal he robbed a bank, in collusion with a teller.) He stops in a convenience store for some disinfectant, just moments before it is robbed; he manages to turn the tables on the robber, but she gets away with his wallet. The store's TV identifies John and his car, so he quickly ditches it, proceeding on foot into an expensive neighborhood. With a sob story about being mugged, he gains entry to the house of Warwick Wilson, who is preparing a dinner party. He makes small talk and drinks red wine while trying to figure out his next move, and how to keep his lies from being found out. When the radio news makes an announcement about John, he angrily shushes Warwick, revealing himself. After forcing him to call his guests to cancel the party, John states that he intends to kill Warwick, but that he might spare him if he accommodates John until morning. Suddenly, John keels over; the wine has been drugged, and Warwick is not the person he seems.

When he comes to, John is tied to a chair, and the party is in swing—but all the guests Warwick is interacting with are figments of Warwick's imagination. Warwick takes a Polaroid of John and reveals a scrapbook of his past dinner parties, each with a murder victim, and a timeline of things Warwick is going to do to him. As the night wears on, John is further terrorized, drugged and incapacitated, and learns various things about Warwick's strange lifestyle.

John and Warwick play chess, with the prize being John's freedom; John, who is an excellent player, wins. Warwick lets John go as agreed but taunts him before he can leave, calling him worthless and secondary. John takes one of the swords on display in Warwick's living room and stabs him with it, but it proves to be a collapsible prop knife, and so Warwick knocks John out. When he regains consciousness again, they are in Warwick's bathroom, and Warwick cuts John's throat.

John's body is left outside with the trash. He wakes up and discovers that most of his injuries are fake; Warwick is a master of movie makeup. Detective Morton arrives at Warwick's door—Warwick is actually a police lieutenant, who is working John's robbery. Meanwhile, while waiting, John gets suspicious of Simone, the bank teller he was working with, and discovers she made alternate travel arrangements out of Los Angeles that don't include him. John locates Simone in a parking garage, taking her switch car and the money, leaving her to be captured by the detectives. Warwick stops John from leaving, and blackmails him for the robbery tape, leaving him with only a couple thousand to get past the Mexican border.

A couple of months later, Detective Morton receives a letter from Mexico (implied to be from John,)—it's a Polaroid from the dinner party of Warwick and John together. A suspicious Morton confronts Warwick, who blows it off, but when Morton persists, Warwick invites Morton to a dinner party.

Cast
 David Hyde Pierce as Warwick Wilson
 Clayne Crawford as John Taylor
 Helen Reddy as Cathy Knight, Warwick's neighbor
 Megahn Perry as Simone Demarchi, John's girlfriend
 Joseph Will as Det. Valdez
 Nathaniel Parker as Det. Morton

Release
The film premiered in January 2010 at the Sundance Film Festival. The Perfect Host played at several other film festivals, including Fantasia 2010 and Sitges 2010. It won the audience award at the Amsterdam Fantastic Film Festival 2011, a Saturn award and best feature at the Abertoir Film Festival 2011: Wales' national horror film festival. The film was released theatrically in the United States on July 1, 2011 in a limited release.

Reception
The Perfect Host has received mixed reviews from critics. On Rotten Tomatoes it has a rating of 45% based on reviews from 33 critics.

The film tied with Atlas Shrugged: Part 1 for the 2011 Saturn Award for Best DVD or Blu-ray Release.

References

External links
 
 
 
 
 
 
 
 Sundance Review

2010 films
2010 black comedy films
2010 psychological thriller films
2010s serial killer films
American black comedy films
American psychological thriller films
American serial killer films
Features based on short films
Films about bank robbery
Films about kidnapping
Films scored by John Swihart
Films shot in Los Angeles
2010s English-language films
2010s American films